Cannibal Attack is a 1954 American adventure film, the fourteenth Jungle Jim film produced by Columbia Pictures. The film features Johnny Weissmuller in his inaugural performance as the protagonist adventurer Johnny Weissmuller, a character previously called "Jungle Jim." The film also features Judy Walsh. It was directed by Lee Sholem and written by Carroll Young. Filmed at the Los Angeles County Arboretum and Botanic Garden, there are no cannibals in the film

The story follows the character Weissmuller battling cannibal looters trying to steal shipments of cobalt. It was theatrically released in North American cinemas in November 1954.

Plot
Jungle roamer Johnny Weissmuller (playing himself) is exploring the African waters of Magi somewhere in mid-Cannibal Valley. While doing so, he stumbles upon a corpse apparently killed by a crocodile. Weissmuller decides to report the death to John King, leader of the white colony in the Magi. King is in charge of mining cobalt for the government, and confides to Weissmuller that recently a few shipments were stolen by looters passing off as crocodiles.

Returning to work, Weissmuller is ambushed by the looters, natives of Magi. He escapes from their clutches unscathed and sets out to recover the stolen cobalt. After a series of unfortunate events, including getting in the way of a giant-sized eagle, Weissmuller discovers a cave filled with the looted goods. He finds out from a Magi native, Luora, that the cobalt hoarders are members of the tribal clan, the Shenzis. They wish to gain more power by stealing the cobalt supplies, as well as end John King's reign.

Weissmuller contacts the police commissioner and personally confronts King, who he believes has a part in the looting. King is revealed to be part-Shenzi and under interrogation, admits to having masterminded the cobalt robberies. There is a brief struggle which results in King accidentally being killed. The other accomplices are promptly arrested. A new colony leader is selected and order in the Cannibal Valley is restored.

Cast
 Johnny Weissmuller
 David Bruce
 Judy Walsh
 Stevan Darrell
 Charles Evans
 Bruce Cowling
 Joseph A. Allen Jr.
 Kimba (the chimpanzee, originally named Tamba)

Production
The film marked the first time Johnny Weissmuller used his own name, due to copyright issues concerning the use of the name "Jungle Jim". It was specified that Weissmuller did not play himself, rather a fictional character bearing the same name he had. Nevertheless, Cannibal Attack and the remaining two films which followed are still recognised by some as part of Columbia's Jungle Jim film series. His character does not wear his usual slouch hat and his chimp has been renamed Kimba from the former Tamba. Lee Sholem directed the film, while Carroll Young wrote both the story and the screenplay. Sam Katzman was in charge of production for Columbia Pictures. Edwin Bryant edited the film and Henry Freulich signed on as cinematographer. Mischa Bakaleinikoff headed the musical direction. Judy Walsh, who was cast as Luora, was loaned by RKO Studios where she was on contract.

Release
Cannibal Attack was officially released in the United States in November 1954. A reviewer for the magazine Variety opined that the "pretentious" film catered only to "juvenile audiences", while the Motion Picture Guide found it to be "pretty decent". In evaluating the film in his 2012 book Columbia Pictures Movie Series, 1926—1955: The Harry Cohn Years, Gene Blottner dubbed the film a "winner", lauding Sholem's directing skills as well as the cast's effort.

References

Bibliography

External links
 
 
Review of film at Variety

1954 films
1954 adventure films
1950s English-language films
Columbia Pictures films
Films directed by Lee Sholem
Jungle Jim films
Films set in Africa
American adventure films
American black-and-white films
1950s American films